The 2019 Carlton Football Club season was the Carlton Football Club's 156th season of competition.

It was the club's men's team's 123rd season as a member of the Australian Football League. After a 1–10 start to the 2019 AFL season, fourth-year senior coach Brendon Bolton was sacked and replaced by David Teague – first as caretaker coach, but later as permanent senior coach. Improved performances in the second half of the season saw the team finish sixteenth out of eighteen teams with a 7–15 record.

It was the club's women's team's third season as a member of the AFL Women's competition. The team finished second out of ten teams in the 2019 AFL Women's season, qualifying for the 2019 AFL Women's Grand Final which it lost against Adelaide by 45 points.

The club also fielded a team in the VFL Women's competition.

Club summary
The 2019 AFL season is the 123rd season of the VFL/AFL competition since its inception in 1897; and, having competed in every season, it is also the 123rd season contested by the Carlton Football Club. Carlton continued its alignment with the Northern Blues in the Victorian Football League, allowing Carlton-listed players to play with the Northern Blues when not selected in AFL matches. Carlton's primary home ground continued to be the Melbourne Cricket Ground, with many games also played at Marvel Stadium (renamed from Etihad Stadium in 2018); traditional home ground Ikon Park continued to serve as the training and administrative base. The club fielded its women's team in the third season of the AFL Women's competition, running in February and March, and Ikon Park served as the home ground for AFL Women's matches.

Car manufacturer Hyundai, which had been a major sponsor of the club continuously since 2008, and airline Virgin Australia, which had upgraded from a secondary sponsor to a major sponsor during the 2017 season, continued as the club's two major sponsors, under deals in place until 2022.

The club again achieved a record membership in 2019, signing a total of 64,269 members through the season. This was the club's second consecutive huge increase in membership numbers, having increased from 50,130 to a then-record 56,005 members in 2018. This translated also to a significant increase in home attendances for the club's matches on previous years.

Senior Personnel
Mark LoGiudice continued as club president, a role he has held since June 2014.

Brendon Bolton commenced the year as the club's senior coach for his fourth season in the role. The club paid out the balance of the protected period in Bolton's open-ended contract to the end of the 2020 season. David Teague, who has been the forwards assistant coach since 2018 and who had previously coached the club's  Northern Bullants from 2008 to 2010, was appointed caretaker coach for the rest of the season; then, with two games remaining in the season, Teague was appointed senior coach on a permanent basis on a three-year contract.

Other than the change of senior coach at midseason, the club's coaching staff was relatively unchanged, with former  and  ruckman Hamish McIntosh joining the club as specialist coach for rucks.

Marc Murphy stepped down as club captain after six seasons in the role. In his place, joint vice-captains Patrick Cripps and Sam Docherty were named joint captains, the first time in club history that joint captains had been named – although Docherty ultimately missed the entire season for the second year in a row after suffering an anterior cruciate ligament injury in the preseason. With no formal vice captains appointed, Murphy, Kade Simpson and Ed Curnow formed the rest of a leadership group which was reduced in size from 2018.

Squad for 2019
The following is Carlton's squad for the 2019 season.

Statistics are correct as of end of 2018 season.
Flags represent the state of origin, i.e. the state in which the player played his Under-18s football.

For players: (c) denotes captain, (vc) denotes vice-captain, (dvc) denotes deputy vice-captain, (lg) denotes leadership group.
For coaches: (s) denotes senior coach, (cs) denotes caretaker senior coach, (a) denotes assistant coach, (d) denotes development coach, (m) denotes managerial or administrative role in a football or coaching department

Playing list changes
The following summarises all player changes which occurred after the 2018 season. Unless otherwise noted, draft picks refer to selections in the 2018 National Draft.

Carlton was keen to draft Liam Stocker, the 2018 Morrish Medallist whom it rated as the sixth-best draft prospect; and when he was yet to be selected in the later stages of the first round, Carlton set about arranging a trade, offering to swap 2019 first round selections with higher-ranking clubs in exchange for a low 2018 selection. It was the first live trade in AFL Draft history after rule changes for this season allowed the practice.

For the early part of the season, the bold decision looked likely to backfire badly, and as late as Round 13, Adelaide was sitting in the top four while Carlton was on the bottom of the ladder, opening the possibility that it would lose the 2019 No. 1 selection in the deal. However, Carlton's stronger end-of-season form saw it rise to 16th, and Adelaide lost seven of its last nine games to fall to 11th; and when the teams entered the 2019 National Draft, Carlton had effectively traded pick No. 4 for pick No. 9 and Stocker. Carlton ultimately traded pick 9 as well, turning the 2019 No. 4 pick into three late first round selections: Stocker (No. 19, 2018), Brodie Kemp (No. 17, 2019) and Sam Philp (No. 20, 2019).

In

Out

List management

Season summary

Pre-season
The club played two full-length practice matches as part of the JLT Community Series.

Home and away season

Awards, records and events
Game records
Round 5 – Carlton's score of 15.11 (101) against  was its first score exceeding 100 points since Round 12, 2016, ending a streak of 59 consecutive games failing to score 100 points. It is the second-longest such streak in the club's history, exceeded only by a streak between 1897 and 1904 when scores above 100 were highly uncommon.
Round 12 – Carlton's home win against  was its first since Round 8, 2018, ending a club record streak of 11 consecutive home losses.

Player records
Round 5 – Patrick Cripps recorded 32 handpasses against , the most ever by a Carlton player in a single game, breaking Greg Williams' 1994 record of 28.
Round 19 – Patrick Cripps recorded 19 clearances against , breaking his own record for most clearances ever by a Carlton player in a game, and the most by any player in the league since 2011.

Individual awards

John Nicholls Medal
The Carlton Football Club Best and Fairest awards night took place on 4 October. The John Nicholls Medal, for the best and fairest player of the club, as well as several other awards, were presented on the night.

John Nicholls Medal
The winner of the John Nicholls Medal was Patrick Cripps, who polled 143 votes. It was Cripps' third John Nicholls Medal, having won the medal previously in 2015 and 2018, and at 24 he became the youngest player ever to win the award three times (surpassing John Nicholls, who won his third at 26). Cripps won a close count ahead of Ed Curnow, who finished second with 138 votes, and Lachie Plowman, who finished third with 134 votes; it was the highest medal placing for both players.

Other awards
The following other awards were presented on John Nicholls Medal night:-
Best First-Year Player – Sam Walsh
Best Clubman – Ed Curnow
Spirit of Carlton Award – Jacob Weitering
Bill Lanyon Inner Blue Ruthless Award – Patrick Cripps
Carltonians William A. Cook Award – Patrick Cripps
Coaches' Award – Levi Casboult

AFL Rising Star
Sam Walsh was the winner of the 2019 NAB AFL Rising Star award, making him the first Carlton player to win the award in the men's competition in its 27-year history. Walsh was nominated for the award in Round 4, and quickly became a strong favourite to win. He went on to poll 54 out of a possible 55 votes in the final count, meaning ten of the eleven judges placed him first and one placed him second. He won by 12 votes from second place getter Connor Rozee. The strength of his performances and his ability to have an impact in games in only his first season was widely noted, and in the process he broke the record for most disposals in a season by a first year player.

Leading goalkickers 
Harry McKay was Carlton's leading goalkicker for the season with 26 goals. It was McKay's first time as Carlton's leading goalkicker. 2018 leading goalkicker Charlie Curnow finished third despite playing only eleven games due to injury.

Other
Honorific teams
Patrick Cripps was named in the centreline of the 2019 All-Australian team. It was Cripps' second consecutive time selected in the team. He was the only Carlton player in the team, or in the original 40-man squad.
Three Carlton players were named in the 22under22 team for the 2019 season: Harry McKay, Sam Walsh and Jacob Weitering. Two other players, Zac Fisher and Sam Petrevski-Seton, were named in the original squad of 40, giving Carlton an equal league-high five nominees in the squad.

AFLPA Awards
For each of the AFLPA awards, one or three Carlton players were nominated by an internal vote of Carlton players; Patrick Cripps and Sam Docherty were also nominated for the Best Captain award by default (despite Docherty not having played a game due to injury).

Carlton had its strongest showing in the AFLPA awards in history, winning two and placing in third. Patrick Cripps won the Leigh Matthews Trophy as AFLPA Most Valuable Player for the first time in his career, finishing 313 votes ahead of Geelong's Tim Kelly; he also placed second in the Best Captain award with 128 votes, behind only West Coast's Shannon Hurn who polled 171. Sam Walsh was a runaway winner of the Best First Year Player award, polling more than three times as many votes as runner up Connor Rozee.

Leigh Matthews Trophy (Most Valuable Player)
Patrick Cripps (winner, 832 votes)
Jacob Weitering (nominated)
Sam Walsh (nominated)
Robert Rose Award (Most Courageous Player)
Liam Jones (nominated)
Best First Year Player
Sam Walsh (winner, 400 votes)
Best Captain
Patrick Cripps (second place, 128 votes)
Sam Docherty (nominated by default)

Australian Football Hall of Fame
Carlton had two former personnel inducted into the Australian Football Hall of Fame during 2019:
Player Ken Hunter, who played 147 games and won three premierships with Carlton in the 1980s, in addition to playing 99 WAFL games at Claremont

Women's teams

AFL Women's
Squad
After having finished last in the 2018 AFLW season, the club replaced inaugural coach Damien Keeping with former Carlton and Northern Bullants player Daniel Harford, who had been coached at Balwyn and St Kevins over the previous decade. Key recruitments to the Carlton AFLW squad were Amelia Mullane, traded from Collingwood, and Madison Prespakis and Abbie McKay in the draft – the latter being the daughter of club champion and administrator Andrew McKay. Brianna Davey remained captain of the club for the second consecutive season; Katie Loynes was vice-captain.

The club's 2019 squad is given below. The number of games played and goals scored in the 2019 season is given in parentheses.

Season summary
The AFL Women's competition expanded from eight clubs to ten in 2019; and to accommodate this within the seven week season, the clubs were split into two conferences of five teams each. Carlton, after losing its first two matches against Conference A opponents, finished the season with four wins from its last five, losing only in a close game to Conference B rival . This saw Carlton finish atop the ladder within Conference B, and saw the team qualify for the finals for the first time.

This conclusion to the season was not without controversy, as Carlton qualified with a record of 4–3 and a percentage of 99.6%, which was a poorer numerical record than both  and  who both missed the finals from Conference A.

Finals
Finishing first in Conference B, Carlton qualified for the preliminary finals, hosting , who had finished second in Conference A. Carlton dominated the preliminary final throughout, gaining a strong lead with a four-goals-to-none second quarter and maintaining that advantage to victory.

This set up a Grand Final against . After an even first quarter which saw Adelaide hold a nine-point quarter time lead, Adelaide proceeded to dominate the second quarter with six goals to Carlton's one, which opened a 40-point half time lead which effectively killed the contest. Only one goal was kicked after half time as Adelaide finished with a 45-point win.

Notable events

In Round 3 against GWS, Carlton scored its highest AFLW score ever, 10.5 (65).
In Round 3 against GWS, Carlton won its first match since Round 2, 2018, ending a 7-game losing streak.
A picture taken by AFL Media photographer Michael Willson of Tayla Harris kicking for goal in Round 7 became the target of sexual internet trolling after it was posted on social media by Seven Network.  Harris re-tweeted the photograph with the caption: "Here's a pic of me at work... think about this before your derogatory comments, animals," in what became an iconic symbol calling for changes in attitudes towards women's sportspeople. Seven initially removed the photo, before reinstating it with an apology for yielding to the trolls instead of moderating them. Willson later won the inaugural Women in Sport Photo Action Awards for the image.
Carlton's preliminary final winning margin of 36 points against  was Carlton's greatest winning margin in AFLW history.
The attendance of 53,034 at the Grand Final was, at the time, a record for any stand-alone women's sporting event in Australian history. This was surpassed in March 2020 by the 2020 ICC Women's T20 World Cup Final; but, as of 2020, remains the highest crowd for a women's Australian football match.

Awards
The following individual awards and honours were won by Carlton players:
Brianna Davey and Madison Prespakis were joint winners of the Carlton Best and Fairest Award.
Brianna Davey, Madison Prespakis and Kerryn Harrington were all named in the 2019 AFL Women's All-Australian team. Gabriella Pound was also included in the original squad of 40.
Madison Prespakis won the AFL Women's Rising Star award, marking Carlton's first ever Rising Star award winner in the club's men's or women's team histories. Prespakis polled 49 votes out of a maximum possible 50 for the award.
Madison Prespakis won the AFLW Players Association Best First Year Player Award.
Brianna Davey won the AFLW Players Association Best Captain Award.
Mark of the Year was won by Tayla Harris.

VFL Women's
Carlton's VFL Women's team contested the VFL Women's competition for the second time, finishing twelfth out of thirteen teams with a win–loss record of 3–10–1.

Northern Blues 
The Carlton Football Club had a full affiliation with the Northern Blues during the 2019 season. It was the seventeenth (and ultimately, the last) season of the clubs' affiliation, which had been in place since 2003. Carlton senior- and rookie-listed players who were not selected to play in the Carlton team were eligible to play for the Northern Blues senior team in the Victorian Football League. The club's home matches were split between the VFL club's traditional home ground Preston City Oval, and Carlton's traditional home ground Ikon Park. The club finished tenth out of fifteen on the final ladder with a win–loss record of 7–11, missing the finals. Carlton-listed player Hugh Goddard won the Laurie Hill Trophy as Northern Blues' best and fairest.

References

Carlton Football Club seasons
Carlton
Carlton